The 1917 Howard Bulldogs football team was an American football team that represented Howard College (now known as the Samford University) as a member of the Southern Intercollegiate Athletic Association (SIAA) during the 1917 college football season. The team compiled an 3–3–1 record, with John Longwell going 2–2–1 through the first five games and C. W. Streit going 1–1 for the final two games of the season.

Schedule

References

Howard
Samford Bulldogs football seasons
Howard Bulldogs football